The 1990 Race of Champions took place on December 8-9 in the Spanish city of Barcelona. It was the third running of the event, and the first year that the International Masters contest was run, allowing up-and-coming rally drivers a chance to mix it with the champions in the main event. Stig Blomqvist retained his title won the previous year, defeating Tommi Makinen in the final.

Participants

International Masters

Preliminary stages

The 12 participants were split into three groups for the round robin first stage of the contest, with the best three from each progressing along with the driver with the fastest time among the losers. The drivers were split as follows:

 Group A - David Llewellin, Jesús Puras, Kenjiro Shinozuka, Marc Duez (Puras eliminated)
 Group B - Kenneth Eriksson, Alain Oreille, Dario Cerrato, Tommi Makinen (Oreille progresses with best losing time)
 Group C - Armin Schwarz, François Chatriot, Josep Maria Bardolet, Josep Bassas (Schwarz eliminated)

Shinozuka, Llewellin, Bardolet and Bassas were then eliminated in the knockout second round.

Quarter-finals

Oreille progressed with the best losing time.

Race of Champions

The main event followed the same format as the International Masters. The drivers were split into groups as follows:

 Group A - Hannu Mikkola, Ari Vatanen, Kenneth Eriksson, François Chatriot (Vatanen eliminated)
 Group B - Timo Salonen, Stig Blomqvist, Markku Alén, Dario Cerrato (Alén eliminated)
 Group C - Carlos Sainz, Björn Waldegård, Alain Oreille, Tommi Makinen (Sainz progresses with best losing time)

Second round

Sainz progressed with the best losing time.

Quarter-finals

Makinen progressed with the best losing time.

References
Information sourced from AUTOSPORT 13/12/90

Race of Champions
Race of Champions
Race of champions
International sports competitions hosted by Catalonia
1990 in Catalan sport